The Very Best of 10cc is a 1997 compilation album by the band 10cc.

Overview
The album features all of the highest charting material from the band's career and also features several songs by Godley & Creme and "Neanderthal Man" by Hotlegs, acts closely associated with 10cc. The album comes with an exclusive essay written by Chris White especially for release.

The compilation uses Greatest Hits 1972–1978 edits of "Rubber Bullets", "Life Is a Minestrone" and "Art for Art's Sake".

For the US release tracklisting was altered: the songs "Une Nuit A Paris", "Wedding Bells", "Under Your Thumb" and "Neanderthal Man" were omitted, "Dreadlock Holiday" and "People in Love" switched places and "For You and I" was added. Also the longer album versions of "Rubber Bullets", "Life Is a Minestrone" and "Art for Art's Sake" were used as well as the full-length version of "Dreadlock Holiday".

Reception
The album charted at No. 37 on the UK Albums Chart and later received a platinum certification.

Chris Jones from BBC Music wrote that "The impresario (Jonathan King) also gave them their name (look it up on Wikipedia if you need to know why) and between 1972 and 1978 they racked up 12 dazzling top 20 hits; all collected here."

Track listing

Charts

Certifications

References

10cc albums
1997 greatest hits albums
Mercury Records compilation albums
PolyGram compilation albums
Universal Music Group compilation albums